Ov Hell is a Norwegian black metal supergroup  started by Shagrath  and King ov Hell in 2009. The band's debut album, The Underworld Regime, was released in February 2010 by  Indie Recordings.

History

Background
Ov Hell was formed by King ov Hell and Shagrath following the temporary dissolution of God Seed in July 2009, which was formed by King and Gaahl in March that year, following the conclusion of the Gorgoroth name dispute which had started in October 2007. 

God Seed performed at the two festivals Hellfest Summer Open Air and With Full Force in summer 2009, covering songs from the Gorgoroth albums Twilight of the Idols and Ad Majorem Sathanas Gloriam. During this period of activity Gaahl was expected to write lyrics and record vocals for the band's intended debut album, for which at numerous times he was claimed to have been undertaking. The rest of the album had already been recorded in 2008, with Frost on drums, Teloch and Ice Dale on guitars and King on bass. However, citing lack of enthusiasm Gaahl quit God Seed at the With Full Force festival and ultimately retired from metal music. King then reincorporated the music which was intended for the God Seed debut album into Ov Hell, and Shagrath wrote and recorded the lyrics and vocals. The album, called The Underworld Regime, was released in Europe in February 2010 by  Indie Recordings, and in the US in April 2010 by Prosthetic Records.

Present situation
Ov Hell has never performed live. In November 2009, King said that he expected the band to be able to do tours and festivals in the future, but in May 2010 he revealed that because of both his own and Shagrath's busy schedules, Ov Hell would not be doing any concerts, and that the band would instead just be a studio band.

Band members
Current members
 Shagrath – vocals (2009–present)
 King ov Hell – bass, backing vocals (2009–present)
Session members
Teloch – guitars (2009)
Frost – drums (2009)
Ice Dale – guitars (2009)

Discography
The Underworld Regime (2010)

References

Norwegian black metal musical groups
Heavy metal duos
Heavy metal supergroups
Musical groups established in 2009
2009 establishments in Norway

Musical groups from Norway with local place of origin missing